Serantes is one of four parishes (administrative divisions) in Tapia de Casariego, a municipality within the province and autonomous community of Asturias, in northern Spain.

It has a population of 700.

Villages and hamlets
 Calambre
 La Lomba
 La Penela
 Pedralba
 Rapalcuarto
 Sampolayo
 Santagadea (Santagadía) 
 Vilanova
 Villamil

Parishes in Tapia de Casariego